María Josepha Sophia de Iturbide (29 February 1872 – November 1949) was the head of the Imperial House of Mexico from 1925 to 1949. A modest and very religious lady, she played no political role whatsoever. She married twice and had two daughters.

Biography

Maria Josepha was born at Mikosdpuszta, Austria-Hungary, on 29 February 1872. She is the eldest child of Prince Salvador de Iturbide and Baroness Gizella Maria Terezia Mikos de Tarrõdhàza. Her father was a grandson of Agustin de Iturbide, royalist military commander turned Mexican insurgent for independence, who was elected emperor of Mexico in 1822 and forced to abdicate. Returning to Mexico after being forced into exile, Iturbide was shot, leaving a widow and children. Emperor Maximilian I of Mexico and his consort, Princess Charlotte of Belgium, unable to have children themselves, adopted the ill-fated emperor's son during their short-lived rule of the Second Mexican Empire.

In 1881, the Itúrbide family left Hungary and moved to Venice. They settled in Venice, where Maria Josepha lived all her youth, distinguishing herself for her modesty and religious piety.
After her father's death in 1895, her mother married again, to Count Emil von Jenison-Walworth in 1900.

Maria Josepha was married to Baron Johann Tunkl of Brníčko (12 July 1872 – 10 May 1915) in Beszterce on 12 March 1908. Following his death in 1915, she married Charles de Carrière (24 November 1875 – November 1949) on 14 April 1923 in Bistriţa.

Following the death of her childless uncle Prince Agustín de Itúrbide in 1925, Maria Josepha inherited whatever claims the Iturbide and Habsburg might have in Mexico, but she played no political role. By this time, events in Mexico have obliterated any such claims. Republican Mexican liberals had captured and executed Emperor Maximilian in 1867 and conservative, monarchist ideas repudiated.  Under President Porfirio Díaz, a liberal army general who had fought against the French invasion, diplomatic relations between Mexico and Austria were resumed. The Mexican Revolution (1910-20) had repudiated the long rule of liberal autocratic President Díaz (1876-1910).  

Maria Josepha was a very traditional woman, a devout Roman Catholic, and stayed as far away from politics as she could.
Despite her very advanced age, she and her second husband, Charles de Carrière, were interned in 1948 by the Romanian Communist government as class enemies of the people. They died under suspicious circumstances shortly after their internment in Deva in November 1949. In accordance with her will and her daughters' wishes, the claim to the throne passed to her only grandson Count Maximiliano Gustav Albrecht Richard Agustin von Goetzen Iturbide, one that probably gave the family a sense of pride in their heritage, but it was highly unlikely to come to fruition in Mexico.

Family

Maria Josepha had two daughters from her first marriage: 
Baroness Maria Anna (1909–1962), childless.
Baroness Maria Gizela (1912–1981). She married Count Gustav von Götzen (d. 1956) and had a son, Count Maximilian von Götzen-Iturbide (b. 1944), who is the current 'Titular Emperor of Mexico' as Maximiliano II. She remarried in 1959 Ottavio Stefano della Porta (1890–1971).

Her second marriage, to Charles de Carrière (1875–1949), was childless.

Ancestry

References

External links
 Imperial House of Mexico

 

1872 births
1949 deaths
Mexican nobility
Pretenders to the Mexican throne
Mexican people of Basque descent
Mexican people of Hungarian descent